China competed at the 2014 Summer Youth Olympics, in Nanjing, China from 16 August to 28 August 2014 as the host country.

Medalists

Medals awarded to participants of mixed-NOC (Combined) teams are represented in italics. These medals are not counted towards the individual NOC medal tally.

Archery

As hosts China was given a quota to compete in both events, however they declined a spot in the boys' event.

Individual

Team

Athletics

China qualified nine athletes.

Qualification Legend: Q=Final A (medal); qB=Final B (non-medal); qC=Final C (non-medal); qD=Final D (non-medal); qE=Final E (non-medal)

Boys
Track & road events

Field Events

Girls
Track & road events

Field events

Mixed events

Badminton

China qualified four athletes based on the 2 May 2014 BWF Junior World Rankings.

Singles

Doubles

Basketball

As hosts China was given a team to compete in both genders.

Skills Competition

Boys' Tournament

Roster
 Fu Lei
 Jiao Hailong
 Li Tiange
 Zhang Zhuo

Group Stage

Knockout Stage

Girls' Tournament

Roster
 Dilana Dilixiati
 Guo Zixuan
 Ha Wenxi
 Wang Zhen

Group Stage

Knockout Stage

Beach volleyball

As hosts China was given a team to compete in both genders, but only selected to send a girls' team.

Boxing

As hosts China was given a male and female quota to compete. China later chose to compete in the boys' 52 kg and girls' 51 kg events.

Boys

Girls

Canoeing

Boys

Girls

Cycling

As hosts China was given a team to compete in the boys' and girls' events, but only chose to compete in the girls' event.

Team

Mixed Relay

Diving

As hosts China was given a quota to compete in all of the events.

Equestrian

As hosts China was given one athlete to compete.

Fencing

China qualified three fencers based on its performance at the 2014 FIE Cadet World Championships.

Boys

Girls

Mixed Team

Field hockey

As the host nation, China has chosen to take part in the girls' tournament.

Girls' Tournament

Roster

 Chen Yang
 Li Hong
 Liu Kailin
 Shen Yang
 Tu Yidan
 Zhang Jinrong
 Zhang Lijia
 Zhang Xindan
 Zhong Jiaqi

Group Stage

Quarterfinal

Semifinal

Gold medal match

Football

As hosts China was given a spot to compete in the girls' tournament.

Girls' Tournament

Roster

 Chen Qiaozhu
 Chen Xia
 Fang Jie
 Jin Kun
 Li Qingtong
 Ma Xiaolan
 Tao Zhudan
 Tu Linli
 Wan Wenting
 Wang Yanwen
 Wu Xi
 Xie Qiwen
 Xu Huan
 Yan Yingying
 Zhan Ying
 Zhang Jiayun
 Zhao Yujie
 Zheng Jie

Group stage

Semi-final

Gold medal match

Golf

As hosts China was given a spot to compete in both genders, but only selected a male.

Individual

Team

Gymnastics

Artistic Gymnastics

China qualified two athletes based on its performance at the 2014 Asian Artistic Gymnastics Championships.

Boys

Girls

Trampoline

China qualified two athletes based on its performance at the 2014 Asian Trampoline Championships.

Handball

As hosts China has chosen to compete in the girls' tournament.

Girls' tournament

Roster

 Cao Wenjie
 Han Yu
 Hao Zerong
 Lin Yanqun
 Liu Xuelu
 Shi Ziwei
 Suo Shanshan
 Xu Hanshu
 Yang Lili
 Yang Lu
 Yang Yin
 Yuan Yu
 Zhang Chunjin
 Zhang Tingting

Group stage

5th place playoffs

First leg

Second leg

Angola win 53-40 on aggregate

Judo

As hosts China was given a spot to compete in the boys' and girls' events. Later China chose to compete in the boys' -66 kg and girls' -52 kg.

Individual

Team

Modern Pentathlon

As hosts China was given a spot to compete in the boys' and girls' events, but only chose to compete in the girls' event.

Rowing

China qualified one boat based on its performance at the Asian Qualification Regatta.

Qualification Legend: FA=Final A (medal); FB=Final B (non-medal); FC=Final C (non-medal); FD=Final D (non-medal); SA/B=Semifinals A/B; SC/D=Semifinals C/D; R=Repechage

Rugby sevens

As hosts China was given a spot to compete in the girls' tournament.

Girls' Tournament

Roster

 Gao Xue
 Gao Yueying
 Li Tian
 Ling Chen
 Liu Xiaoqian
 Luo Yawen
 Shen Yingying
 Sun Caihong
 Wang Tingting
 Wu Fan
 Yan Meiling
 Yang Feifei

Group Stage

Semifinal

Bronze Medal Match

Sailing

China was given an additional quota spot to compete.

Shooting

As hosts China was given a spot to compete in the boys' 10m air pistol and girls' 10m air rifle events. Later China qualified an additional spot based on its performance at the 2014 Asian Shooting Championships.

Individual

Team

Swimming

China qualified eight swimmers.

Boys

Girls

Mixed

Table tennis

As hosts China was given a spot to compete in the boys' and girls' events.

Singles

Team

Qualification Legend: Q=Main Bracket (medal); qB=Consolation Bracket (non-medal)

Taekwondo

As hosts China was given three spots to compete in boys' events and three spots to compete in girls' events, but only chose four events to compete in. Later China chose to compete in the boys' +73 kg and girls' -49 kg, -63 kg, +63 kg weight categories.

Boys

Girls

Tennis

China qualified two athletes based on the 9 June 2014 ITF World Junior Rankings.

Singles

Doubles

Triathlon

China selected to participate in the female event.

Individual

Relay

Weightlifting

As hosts China was given two spots to compete in the boys' events and two spots to compete in the girls' events, but only selected to use one per gender.

Boys

Girls

Wrestling

China qualified one athlete based on its performance at the 2014 Asian Cadet Championships.

Key:
  - Victory by Fall.
  - Decision by Points - the loser with technical points.
  - Decision by Points - the loser without technical points.

Girls

References

2014 in Chinese sport
Nations at the 2014 Summer Youth Olympics
China at the Youth Olympics